The Mayombe National Alliance  (ALLIAMA) is a defunct, separatist organization that campaigned for the independence of Cabinda province from Portugal. ALLIAMA merged with the Action Committee of the Cabinda National Union and the Movement for the Liberation of the Enclave of Cabinda in 1963 to form the Front for the Liberation of the Enclave of Cabinda (FLEC). Cabinda is now a province and an exclave of Angola.

See also
1960s in Angola
Angolan War of Independence
Mayombe

References

Rebel groups in Angola
National liberation movements in Africa
Cabinda independence movement